Ananta Prasad Paudel (born 28 July 1962) is a member of 2nd Nepalese Constituent Assembly. He won Makwanpur–3 seat in CA assembly, 2013 with 14267 votes. He also served as a Communist Party of Nepal (Unified Marxist–Leninist) district secretary from 1997 to 2002.

References

1962 births
Living people
People from Makwanpur District
Communist Party of Nepal (Unified Marxist–Leninist) politicians
Members of the 2nd Nepalese Constituent Assembly